Stephen Carl Porter (1864 – January 13, 1946) was an American pioneer recording artist, who recorded prolifically for numerous recording companies in the 1890s and early 1900s.  He was also an entrepreneur who helped establish the recording industry in India in the early years of the twentieth century, and successfully marketed a new form of hearing aid.

Biography
He was born in New York City.  In the 1890s he performed as a baritone singer in vaudeville, as a member of the Diamond Comedy Four with Albert Campbell, Jim Reynard, and Billy Jones, who worked as song pluggers in "Tin Pan Alley" for the music publishers Joe Stern and Edward B. Marks. Porter first recorded with the Diamond Comedy Four and Diamond Quartette for Stern and Marks' Universal Phonograph Company in early 1897. In later 1897 he began recording for Berliner Gramophone with the Diamond Comedy Four and Diamond Four, and solo, and for the Columbia Phonograph Company with the Greater New York Quartette (with Harding, Spencer and Depew) and solo. His solo recordings of "On the Banks of the Wabash", "She Was More to Be Pitied Than Censured" (1898), "A Picture No Artist Can Paint" (1899), "A Bird in a Gilded Cage" (1900), and "The Little Brown Jug" (1900) sold well.

In 1901, after an attempt to set up a motion picture company with fellow recording artist Russell Hunting failed, Porter established the American Phonograph Record Company of Brooklyn, with William F. Hooley and Samuel H. Rous of The Haydn Quartet as co-directors.  However, this again failed, and in 1902 Porter sailed to London, where he recorded for Waterfield, Clifford & Company before joining the 
Nicole Record Co..  He worked there both as a recording engineer and as a performer, recording comic tunes, ballads and old standards, before sailing to India with John Watson Hawd to set up a recording business for Nicole Frères in Calcutta.  Porter then traveled around India and Burma, finding musicians to be recorded in Nicole's Calcutta studio.  He finally returned to the US in 1905.

After his return, he recorded as one member of the Columbia Male Quartet, known after 1906 as the Peerless Quartet, who originally also included tenors Henry Burr and Albert Campbell, and bass Tom Daniels.  Porter remained with the quartet until 1909.  However, Porter increasingly performed as a comedic artist, becoming popular for his Irish characterizations and skits.  He recorded many of these for Edison and Columbia after 1906, an example being "Pat O'Brien's Automobile" (1908).

After 1909, Porter recorded mainly as a member of the American Quartet, with Billy Murray, John Bieling, and William F. Hooley. Their most successful recordings included "Oh, You Beautiful Doll" (1911), "Moonlight Bay" (1912), "It's a Long, Long Way to Tipperary" (1914), and "Over There" (1917).  Porter also continued his entrepreneurial activities, filing a patent for a new form of record in 1911, and in 1916 established a business, the Port-O-Phone Corporation, to market a new type of acoustic hearing aid.  Unlike his previous enterprises, this was a relatively profitable undertaking, and the hearing aids were successfully marketed around the world.

Porter left the American Quartet in 1919, although his recording career continued into the 1920s.  The Port-O-Phone Corporation suffered a near-collapse in the Wall Street Crash of 1929, and was wound up a few years later as its models were superseded by new technology.

Steve Porter died in 1946 at the age of 81.

References

External links
 Steve Porter recordings at the Discography of American Historical Recordings.

1864 births
1946 deaths
Pioneer recording artists
American baritones
Victor Records artists
Columbia Records artists
Edison Records artists
Singers from New York (state)
Vaudeville performers